The Litlington White Horse is a chalk hill figure depicting a horse, situated on Hindover Hill (known locally as High-and-Over) in the South Downs, looking over the River Cuckmere to the west of the village of Litlington and north of East Blatchington in East Sussex, England.

A previous horse was cut in either 1838 or 1860 on the same site. Since 1991, the horse has been owned by the National Trust, who, along with local volunteers, regularly clean and maintain the horse.

The Litlington White Horse is one of two hill figures in East Sussex; the other being the Long Man of Wilmington which is situated 3 miles north-east from the White Horse.

Original Litlington White Horse
The origin and date of the original White Horse is debated. One view is that it was created by James Pagden of Frog Firle Farm, along with his two brothers and cousin William Ade (1820–92), in 1838 to commemorate the coronation of Queen Victoria. Another view is that the horse was cut in 1860 by two local boys, noticing a patch of bare chalk resembling a horse's head, they proceeded to cut away the rest of the horse to complement it. Although the first story is the one most generally accepted, it is possible that these boys recut the horse after it had been neglected, causing this confusion.

Several accounts including one in 1865 suggests a large cross was situated alongside the horse on Hindover Hill, although from the 1890s accounts of the horse fail to mention any presence of a cross.

Failure to maintain the first horse meant it was completely covered by the early 1910s, with the last recorded sighting of the horse being in 1912, having been described as barely visible due to significant over growth. Based on local records, the original horse was likely located 100 yards to the north-west of the present horse, although its exact location is unknown.

Current Litlington White Horse

The current horse was carved by John T. Ade (the son of William Ade), Mr. Bovis, and Eric Hobbis in one night on the full moon of 20 February 1924. 
Originally designed by John Ade in the winter of 1923, he drew inspiration from the Westbury White Horse. According to the accounts of John T. Ade, they first laid out the horse using ropes and pegs at Ade's Grove Hill Farm in the nearby village of Hellingly in preparation for its cutting in Litlington. 
During the February full moon, the men cut the horse using a 'stick' of 35 inches as a measurement for a quick transfer of their design. The horse was cut without the knowledge of the local residents, who awoke startled by the horse's appearance on the side of the hill; this may have been the motivation behind the speedy cutting.

The horse has since been maintained by local residents, although it was covered in the late 1930s by the Ministry of Defence as to prevent it from being used as a location marker for the Luftwaffe in World War II, after maps featuring hill figures were found on captured German aircrew. The rushed uncovering of the horse in 1945, by contractors from the ministry of defence, resulted in several changes to the horse's original shape, including only one front leg being recut. This was not corrected until the full moon of 9 June 1949, when between 10pm and 3am, John T Ade, alongside Bovis and Harris made several further changes to return the horse to its original appearance, including recutting an additional front leg and readjusted the back which 'had shifted uphill a bit from saddle to rump'. According to several accounts during the 1920s and 30s, below the horse was cut a large letter S and to its right an irregular shape which resembled a lion's head.

In the late 1980s, the East Sussex County Council scoured the horse and installed wooden boards around the horse to keep the chalk in place, alongside the installation of a perimeter fence to prevent damage from livestock. It was at this time that the horse was changed from a standing position to a prancing position, in order to prevent a slippage of chalk rubble used to fill the figure. A significant issue in the horse's preservation has been around the legs acting as channels for running water, causing the legs to become straightened, elongated and splay out to form deltas at the hooves. In 1991, Frog Firle Farm along with the White Horse which is situated in its grounds, was acquired by the National Trust who has since regularly maintained the horse, being last scoured in 2016. In May 2017, the horse was vandalised with the adding of a unicorn horn, although it was quickly removed.

Situated on the peak of Hindover Hill is a free car park located along Alfriston Road, being only a short footpath walk down to the White Horse. A better view of the horse is, however, obtained from across the valley by walking south along the banks of the River Cuckmere from Litlington village.

Folklore

A local folklore suggests that the horse was originally cut as a memorial to a local girl whose horse bolted when ridding along the brow of Hindover Hill, throwing her down the hill which resulted in her death. However, there is no evidence to suggest this to be true.

Another story suggests the hill figure originally depicted a dog, cut by a grieving boy to mark the grave of his dog which was killed either alongside or in the River Cuckmere below. Supposedly, due to erosion of the dogs nose and legs over the following years it began to depict a horse, causing the figure to take its present form. Nevertheless, there is also no evidence which suggests this to be true.

According to historian Rodney Castleden, local legend suggests Hindover Hill once hosted the figure of a giant similar to the Long Man of Wilmington, but has long since been forgotten. Like other local legends regarding the hill, there is no evidence to hold it true.

In popular culture

Litlington White Horse was the solution to Pimania, the UK's first real-life video treasure hunt game. First released in 1982, the clues revealing the White Horse were not identified until 1985, by which time its publisher Automata UK had ceased trading.

Litlington White Horse served as the inspiration for Miriam Moss's book The Horse Girl (2002), which depicts a young girl who secretly carves a large white horse in the chalky hill overlooking her village due to her mother forbidding her from going near real horses.

See also

Other white horses
Alton Barnes white horse 
Broad Town White Horse 
Cherhill White Horse 
Devizes White Horse
Hackpen White Horse 
Kilburn White Horse 
Marlborough White Horse
Osmington White Horse 
Pewsey White Horse 
Uffington White Horse 
Westbury White Horse 
Woolbury White Horse

Other hill figures
Bulford Kiwi 
Cerne Abbas Giant 
Fovant Badges 
Lamb Down Military Badge
Long Man of Wilmington
Solsbury Hill turf maze
The Mizmaze

References

White horses (hill figures) in England
History of East Sussex
Tourist attractions in East Sussex